Deudorix dinomenes, the orange playboy, is a butterfly of the family Lycaenidae. It is found in Senegal, Guinea, Sierra Leone, Ivory Coast, Ghana, Benin, Nigeria, Cameroon, the Central African Republic, the Democratic Republic of the Congo, Uganda, Sudan, Kenya, Tanzania, Malawi, Zambia, Zimbabwe, Mozambique and South Africa.

The wingspan is 24–30 mm for males and 26–32 mm for females. Adults are on wing year-round with a peak from April to July.

The larvae probably feed on the fruit of Deinbollia species

Subspecies
Deudorix dinomenes dinomenes (coast of Kenya, Tanzania, Malawi, Zambia, eastern Zimbabwe, Mozambique, South Africa: KwaZulu-Natal to the north)
Deudorix dinomenes diomedes Jackson, 1966 (Senegal, Guinea, Sierra Leone, Ivory Coast, Ghana, Benin, western Nigeria, Cameroon, Central African Republic, Democratic Republic of the Congo, southern Sudan, Uganda, Kenya: west to the Kakamega Forest, western Tanzania)

References

Butterflies described in 1887
Deudorigini
Lepidoptera of Cape Verde
Butterflies of Africa
Taxa named by Henley Grose-Smith
Deudorix